Microcaryum is a monotypic genus of flowering plants belonging to the family Boraginaceae. The only species is Microcaryum pygmaeum.

Its native range is Nepal to China (Sichuan).

References

Boraginoideae
Boraginaceae genera
Monotypic asterid genera